Borisovka is a rural locality (a village) in Bakeyevsky Selsoviet, Sterlibashevsky District, Bashkortostan, Russia. The population was 35 as of 2010. There is 1 street.

Geography 
Borisovka is located 18 km southeast of Sterlibashevo (the district's administrative centre) by road. Novonikolayevka is the nearest rural locality.

References 

Rural localities in Sterlibashevsky District